LaDoris Hazzard Cordell is an American retired judge of the Superior Court of California and former Independent Police Auditor for the city of San Jose, California. She is an advocate for improving transparency into charges of police misconduct. She was assistant dean at the Stanford Law School, where she helped develop a program to increase 
minority recruitment. Within a year, Stanford Law School went from last to first place in enrollment of African-American and Hispanic students, among major law schools.

She was the first female African-American judge in Northern California and the first female African-American Superior Court judge in Santa Clara County, California. Her memoir, Her Honor: My Life on the Bench...What Works, What's Broken, and How to Change It, was published in 2021.

Education
She received her BA degree from Antioch College in 1971, and JD degree from Stanford Law School in 1974.

Career
In 1975, she was the first person in the Western United States to serve as the Earl Warren Intern at the NAACP Legal Defense and Education Fund. From 1976 to 1982, she practiced as a private attorney in East Palo Alto, CA, specializing in criminal defense law, personal injury law, family law, and federal civil rights law. From 1978 to 1982, she was assistant dean for Student Affairs at Stanford Law School.

In 1982, California governor Jerry Brown appointed her to be a municipal court judge for the County of Santa Clara, CA. As municipal court judge, she was the first California judge to order breath devices installed into the cars of drivers convicted of driving while under the influence of alcohol, and was presiding judge from 1985 to 1986. In 1988, she was elected to become a superior court judge for the County of Santa Clara, where she served as supervising judge for the probate court from 1994 to 1995, supervising judge of the family court from 1990 to 1992, and presiding judge of the superior court appellate department in 1993.

From 2001 to 2009 she served as Stanford University's vice provost and special counselor to the president for campus relations, where she supervised the Office for Campus relations. In a campaign in which she refused monetary contributions, she was elected to the Palo Alto City Council in 2004, where she served until 2008. From 2010 to 2015, she served as Independent Police Auditor for the City of San Jose, CA.

In 2018, Cordell led the opposition to a petition to recall fellow Stanford graduate and Santa Clara County Judge Aaron Persky, after Persky's sentencing of Brock Turner to six months in county jail for three counts of sexual assault sparked a public backlash. Persky was successfully recalled later that year. 

Cordell appeared as the judge on the American reality prime-time court show You the Jury, canceled after two episodes.

Upon publication of her book, the judge was interviewed as the guest on the KQED radio program Forum.. In relation to her book, she discussed a number of the problems she considered to be present in the legal system. She described the book as a "primoir, " i.e. a combination of a primer and a memoir.

Awards
She has received numerous awards and prizes for social activism and breaking race and gender barriers, including the Rose Bird Memorial Award from the California Women Lawyers and the Rosa Parks Ordinary People Award from the NAACP.

References

Living people
Date of birth missing (living people)
African-American judges
Antioch College alumni
Stanford University people
People from Santa Clara County, California
People from Palo Alto, California
People from East Palo Alto, California
Superior court judges in the United States
American women judges
1949 births
21st-century African-American people
21st-century African-American women